Mills is a male given name which may refer to:

Mills Darden (1799–1857), alleged to have been one of the largest men in history
Mills Gardner (1830–1910), American attorney, politician and U.S. Representative from Ohio
Mills E. Godwin, Jr. (1914–1999), American politician and 60th and 62nd Governor of Virginia
Mills Lane (1937–2022), American judge and star of the TV show Judge Mills Lane, boxer and boxing referee
Mills Lane (banker) (1912–1989), American banker, uncle of the above
Mills Watson (born 1940), American actor